Dynamic Greece is a citizens movement founded in 2012. Dynamic Greece is part of the Olive Tree electoral alliance formed to contest the 2014 European election.

References

External links

Political parties in Greece